Mister Guitar is the eleventh studio album recorded by guitarist Chet Atkins, released in 1959. That title, as well as "Country Gentleman", became names assigned to Chet.

"Country Gentleman", co-written with Boudleaux Bryant, was a minor hit for Atkins in 1953. That original version was recorded in a garage. The liner notes are by David Halberstam, then writing for The Tennessean in Nashville, Tennessee.

Reissues 
 Mister Guitar was packaged with Chet Atkins in Three Dimensions and released on CD in 1998 by One Way Records.
 In 2002, Mister Guitar was reissued with Chet Atkins' Workshop by Classic Compact Disc (Disc 2103).

Track listing

Side one 
 "I Know That You Know" (Anne Caldwell, Vincent Youmans) – 1:53
 "Rainbow" (Alfred Bryan, Percy Wenrich) – 2:27
 "Hello Bluebird" (Cliff Friend) – 2:06
 "Siesta" (Atkins, James Rich) – 2:10
 "Country Style" (Johnny Burke, Jimmy Van Heusen) – 2:02
 "Show Me the Way to Go Home" (James Campbell, Reginald Connelly) – 2:06

Side two 
 "I'm Forever Blowing Bubbles" (John Kellette, James Kendis, James Brockman, Nat Vincent) – 1:30
 "Backwoods" (James Rich) – 2:09
 "Country Gentleman" (Atkins, Boudleaux Bryant) – 1:53
 "Slinkey" (Atkins) – 1:59
 "Jessie" (Traditional) – 1:44
 "Piano Concerto in B-Flat Minor" (Pyotr Ilyich Tchaikovsky) – 2:27

Personnel 
 Chet Atkins – guitar

Production notes 
 Engineered by Bob Farris and Bill Porter

References 

1959 albums
Chet Atkins albums
Albums produced by Chet Atkins
RCA Records albums